Australian Dairy Foods is a trade magazine for the dairy industry in Australia. It is published bi-monthly by the Dairy Industry Association of Australia.

History and profile
The magazine was first published in 1942 under the name Butter Fat & Solids by the Australian Institute of Dairy Factory Managers and Secretaries. In 1979, it was expanded and renamed Australian Dairy Foods.

The magazine covers a range of topics - latest news, company profiles, latest equipment, research, industry insights, and more. Its mission is to deliver accurate and relevant information that contributes to its readers' industry knowledge and expertise.

The magazine also features the results of DIAA's National and State dairy product competitions. Innovators from all sectors of the industry are regularly profiled.

In 2008 Australian Dairy Foods was recognised for the quality of its news coverage at the "2008 Tabbies", an international business-to-business competition run by the US-based "Trade, Association and Business Publications International".

References

External links 
 Australian Dairy Foods magazine
 Dairy Industry Association of Australia
 Trade, Association and Business Publications International

1942 establishments in Australia
Bi-monthly magazines published in Australia
Business magazines published in Australia
Monthly magazines published in Australia
Food and drink magazines
Magazines established in 1942
Magazines published in Melbourne
Professional and trade magazines
Dairy farming in Australia